Syukuran Aminuddin Amir Airport  is an airport near Luwuk, the capital city of Banggai Regency, in the province of Central Sulawesi on the island of Sulawesi in Indonesia.

Facilities

Airlines and destinations

Airlines currently serving this airport :

References

Airports in Central Sulawesi